The 1947 Bluefield State Big Blues football team was an American football team that represented Bluefield State College during the 1947 college football season. In its first and only season under head coach S. Walker, the team compiled a 3–6 record and outscored opponents by a total of 85 to 74.

Schedule

References

Bluefield State
Bluefield State Big Blues football seasons
Bluefield State Big Blues football